Hearne is a city in Robertson County, Texas, United States.  As of the 2020 census, the city population was 4,544.  The city is named for a family that settled in the area in the 19th century and promoted the construction of rail lines through the city.

History

Founding
Hearne is located on land that initially belonged to politician and soldier José Francisco Ruiz. By the 1840s, a tavern was located there and it also served as a general store and post office. The Hearne family moved to the area in the 1850s, purchasing 10,000 acres and operating cotton plantations. Christopher C. Hearne wanted a railroad line built through the area, but the Civil War started before the railroad could be constructed. His widow later gave 700 acres to the Houston and Texas Central Railway.

With the construction of a depot in Hearne in 1868, businesses began to open, including a hotel, saloons, churches and a cotton gin. Two rail lines met in Hearne by the 1870s. Hearne's population was 2,129 in 1900 and 3,511 in 1940. Between 1943 and 1946, a prison camp operated near the city limits and held several thousand German prisoners of war. Agricultural and manufacturing businesses came to Hearne by the 1960s. By 1990, over 5,000 people lived in Hearne; the population was 4,690 in 2000.

Wal-Mart closure
On New Year's Eve 1990, the Wal-Mart in Hearne closed. After closure, the store was converted into the current Hearne High School. Merchants in downtown Hearne by that time had already folded their businesses because they were unable to compete with Wal-Mart. The New York Times reported that out of more than 1,500 Wal-Mart stores in the nation, the Hearne store was one of six that had closed.

Drug sweeps and ACLU lawsuit
In November 2000, 15 African-American residents of Hearne, Texas, were indicted on drug charges after being arrested in a series of "drug sweeps". The ACLU filed a class action lawsuit, Kelly v. Paschall, on their behalf, alleging that the arrests were unlawful. The ACLU contended that 15 percent of Hearne's male African American population aged 18 to 34 (and at least one woman) were arrested based on the "uncorroborated word of a single unreliable confidential informant coerced by police to make cases." The government had promised the informant leniency on a burglary charge and a hundred dollars in cash in exchange for each suspect he helped convict.

On May 11, 2005, the ACLU and Robertson County announced a confidential settlement of the lawsuit, an outcome which "both sides stated that they were satisfied with." District Attorney John Paschall dismissed the charges against the plaintiffs of the suit. He also admitted that the witness had tampered with evidence and failed a polygraph test.
 A movie, American Violet, was made about the incident.

Shooting of Pearlie Golden

In May 2014, protesters demonstrated against the shooting of a 93-year-old woman named Pearlie Golden by the Hearne Police Department.   After Officer Stephen Stem responded to a disturbance at Golden's residence, police officials said that Golden had discharged a firearm into the ground twice. Stem shot Golden three times, resulting in Golden's death.

The officer had been on the police force since 2012 and it was his second fatal shooting. Stem was placed on leave and Hearne mayor Ruben Gomez recommended Stem's firing. He was terminated by a unanimous city council vote. Stem's attorney said that some community members had turned a safety issue into one focused on age, race and gender.

Geography

Hearne is located at  (30.877989, –96.595665). General aviation service is provided by Hearne Municipal Airport.

Climate

The climate in this area is characterized by hot, humid summers and generally mild to cool winters.  According to the Köppen Climate Classification system, Hearne has a humid subtropical climate, abbreviated "Cfa" on climate maps. Hearne was subject to heavy flooding on May 13, 2004 when  of rain fell in an hour.

Demographics

Hearne is part of the Bryan-College Station metropolitan area.

As of the 2020 United States census, there were 4,544 people, 1,682 households, and 1,110 families residing in the city.

As of the census of 2000, there were 4,690 people, 1,710 households, and 1,190 families residing in the city. The population density was 1,144.2 people per square mile (441.7/km). There were 1,944 housing units at an average density of 474.3 per square mile (183.1/km). The racial makeup of the city was 44.41% African American, 38.12% White (including Hispanics), 0.49% Native American, 0.17% Asian, 0.04% Pacific Islander, 14.48% from other races, and 2.28% from two or more races. Hispanic or Latino of any race were 28.10% of the population.

There were 1,710 households, out of which 36.7% had children under the age of 18 living with them, 39.2% were married couples living together, 25.6% had a female householder with no husband present, and 30.4% were non-families. 27.8% of all households were made up of individuals, and 15.4% had someone living alone who was 65 years of age or older. The average household size was 2.70 and the average family size was 3.31.

In the city, the population was spread out, with 32.9% under the age of 18, 9.1% from 18 to 24, 24.3% from 25 to 44, 18.7% from 45 to 64, and 15.1% who were 65 years of age or older. The median age was 32 years. For every 100 females, there were 84.4 males. For every 100 females age 18 and over, there were 77.8 males.

The median income for a household in the city was $19,556, and the median income for a family was $25,538. Males had a median income of $24,013 versus $19,306 for females. The per capita income for the city was $9,716. About 29.2% of families and 31.2% of the population were below the poverty line, including 45.2% of those under age 18 and 25.8% of those age 65 or over.

Education
Hearne High School, an entity of the Hearne Independent School District, was a Texas Education Agency-recognized campus in 2008. The Hearne Junior High School was a TEA-recognized campus in 2010 and Hearne Elementary School received the academically acceptable rating from TEA in 2013

Notable people

 Patrick Edwards, former NFL wide receiver
 Rosie Lee Moore Hall, was Aunt Jemima for 25 years. Quaker Oats
 Lance Hoyt, professional wrestler working for All Elite Wrestling
 R. Bowen Loftin, former President of Texas A&M University
 Jerry D. Merryman , The hand-held pocket calculator was invented at Texas Instruments, Incorporated (TI) in 1966 by a development team which included Jerry D. Merryman, James H. Van Tassel and Jack St. Clair Kilby
 Rodrick Monroe, NFL tight end
 Steve O'Neal, former American football punter and wide receiver who holds the record for the longest punt in professional football history
 John Randle, Hall of Fame NFL defensive tackle
 Jose Francisco Ruiz, the original grantee of nine-leagues of land that comprise Hearne, Texas
 David Schnaufer, (1952–2006) dulcimer virtuoso and first professor of dulcimer; credited with restoring popularity of the instrument in contemporary music

Images

References

External links

 City of Hearne
 Hearne Chamber of Commerce
 Frontline's documentary The Plea

Cities in Robertson County, Texas
Cities in Texas
Bryan–College Station